Nick Moore (born July 17, 1983) is an American musician from Findlay, Ohio. He is best known as the lead vocalist and primary songwriter of the Billboard charting band Before Their Eyes on Rise Records.

On April 18, 2010, Moore announced that he would be leaving Before Their Eyes and asked for support for his new project, later revealed to be Planet AD. However, on December 26, 2010, he announced via Facebook that he was back in Before Their Eyes.

Moore is also known for starting the record label StandBy Records in 2007, which signed the American Billboard charting band Emarosa and the international recording artist Hopes Die Last. In 2008, Moore sold the company to HM-Live's owner, Neil Sheehan. In August 2009, he started a new record label called inVogue Records. With inVogue, he signed the recording artist The Plot in You and other rock and post-hardcore bands. Notable artists on InVogue Records include pop-punk giants Chunk! No, Captain Chunk!, San Diego melodic hardcore band Being As An Ocean, metalcore band Famous Last Words, and spoken-word project Hotel Books.

Moore was also the vocalist and played guitar for the pop/punk band The Drama Summer.

In early 2013 Nick announced he started a new band called Gentlemen Roosevelt that he does vocals and plays guitar in.

On November 15, 2017 Nick opened up a retail clothing shop called Flag City Clothing in his hometown of Findlay, Ohio. In July 2021 he sold the company.

In June 2021 Alternative Press announced the launch of Thriller Records founded by Bob Becker (Founder of Fearless Records) and Nick.

Personal life
Nick is married to Brittany Moore. They reside in Findlay, Ohio and have three kids.

References

External links
 Official Facebook music page
 Official Twitter

1983 births
Living people
Musicians from Ohio